Riesch may refer to:
Maria Riesch, German alpine skier and three-time Olympic gold medalist
Susanne Riesch, German alpine skier, younger sister of above
Johann Sigismund Riesch, (2 August 1750 - 2 November 1821) Austrian soldier and general officer in the Napoleonic Wars 

German-language surnames